The 1926–27 Drexel Engineers men's basketball team represented Drexel Institute of Art, Science and Industry during the 1926–27 men's basketball season. The Engineers, led by 2nd year head coach Ernest Lange, played their home games at Main Building.

Roster

Schedule

|-
!colspan=9 style="background:#F8B800; color:#002663;"| Regular season
|-

References

Drexel Dragons men's basketball seasons
Drexel
1926 in sports in Pennsylvania
1927 in sports in Pennsylvania